Nossa Senhora da Luz (Portuguese 'Our Lady of Light') may refer to the following :

 Our Lady of the Candles, a venerated Marian apparition

Places, churches and jurisdictions 
in Brazil 
 Our Lady of Light Cathedral, Guarabira (Catedral Nossa Senhora da Luz), Paraiba, Brazil

in Cape Verde 
 Nossa Senhora da Luz (Maio), in the municipality and island of Maio
 Nossa Senhora da Luz (São Domingos), in the municipality of São Domingos, island of Santiago
 Nossa Senhora da Luz (São Vicente), in the municipality and island of São Vicente